Anna Meder, born Anna Görlin or Gerlin or Gerler in Steinenkirch  (-1649) was a German printer of the 17th century in Ulm.

Biography 
Anna Görlin was born in October 1606 in Steinenkirch. Her father was a Protestant minister. She married the printer Johann Sebastian Meder (1612-1635) who died in 1635 most probably of the plague. After his death, Anna Meder took over the management of the Mederische Truckerey printing house, a common appointment for a widow at that time. The Ulm Council tried in vain to convince her brother-in-law Michael Meder from Rostock to take over the printing shop and Anna Meder was then officially appointed printer of the city of Ulm on July, 1st 1636. She remained in this position in Ulm until 1637. During this period she printed the Ulmische Danksagungspredigt by the Ulm theologian and pedagogue Konrad Dieterich, as well as the Leichenpredigt, a funeral sermon by the renowned Ulm physician Gregory Horstius.

In August 1637 Anna Meder married Balthasar Kühn (1615-1667), a printer from Erfurt, who from then on ran the official printing house of the city of Ulm for a salary of 40 florins. From this union three daughters and a son named Christian Balthasar Kühn (1644-1678) were born. After his father's death, their son took over the management of the printing house.

Selected publications 
 Ulmische Danksagungspredigt des Konrad Dieterich. Ulm 1636 (imprimé à Ulm par Johann=Sebastian Meders S. Wittib. Anno M. DC. XXXVI.), VD17 23:630553N. Leichenpredigt für Gregor Horstius. Ulm 1636, 88 pages.

Bibliography 
 Christoph Reske: Die Buchdrucker des 16. und 17. Jahrhunderts im deutschen Sprachgebiet. Harrassowitz, Wiesbaden 2007, S. 939.

Internet links

References 

1606 births
1646 deaths
17th-century German women
17th-century printers
17th-century publishers (people)